Daviesia bursarioides, commonly known as Three Springs daviesia, is a species of flowering plant in the family Fabaceae and is endemic to a restricted part of the south-west of Western Australia. It is a straggling shrub with widely-spreading, spiny branches, scattered, flattened phyllodes, and yellow, deep pink and maroon flowers.

Description

Taxonomy and naming
Daviesia bursarioides was first formally described in 1995 by Michael Crisp in Australian Systematic Botany from specimens he collected near Three Springs in 1980. The specific epithet (bursarioides) means "Bursaria-like".

Distribution and habitat
This species of pea grows in undulating mallee shrubland around Three Springs in the Avon Wheatbelt biogeographic region of south-western Western Australia.

Conservation status
Daviesia bursarioides is classified as "endangered" under the Australian Government Environment Protection and Biodiversity Conservation Act 1999 and a recovery plan has been prepared. The species is also listed as "Threatened Flora (Declared Rare Flora — Extant)" by the Department of Biodiversity, Conservation and Attractions. The main threats to the species include inappropriate maintenance of roads, fences and firebreaks.

References

bursarioides
Eudicots of Western Australia
Plants described in 1995
Taxa named by Michael Crisp